Georgi Georgiev Kostadinov (born 7 September 1990) is a Bulgarian professional footballer who plays as a defensive midfielder for Cypriot First Division club APOEL and the Bulgarian national team.

Career

Early career
Born in Tsarevo, Kostadinov began his career with Naftex Burgas. In 2007–08, he helped Naftex win the Bulgarian U19 Championship, scoring the only goal in the final against CSKA Sofia.

In June 2009, Kostadinov joined Pomorie.

Ludogorets
On 16 January 2012, Kostadinov signed for Ludogorets Razgrad. His A Group debut was on 18 March, as a substitute against Svetkavitsa, replacing Stanislav Genchev in the 78th minute. Six minutes later he scored his first goal, netting the fourth in a 5–0 victory.

Kostadinov won two Bulgarian League titles, a Bulgarian Cup and the Bulgarian Supercup for Ludogorets, but struggled to hold down a place in the first team, totalling 13 games and two goals.

Beroe
On 19 August 2013, Kostadinov joined Beroe Stara Zagora as a free agent. He signed a two-year contract with the club and was given the number 70 shirt. Kostadinov made his debut in the same day in a 0–0 home draw against Cherno More, coming on as an 85th-minute substitute for Élio Martins. He scored his first Beroe goal on 9 March 2014, in a 3–1 away win over Chernomorets Burgas. Kostadinov spent two seasons with the club, where he scored 8 goals in 49 league matches.

Levski Sofia

After his contract with Beroe expired, Kostadinov joined Levski Sofia. On 3 July 2015, he signed a two-year contract with Levski. His competitive debut came against Botev Plovdiv in the opening game of the Bulgarian League season on 18 July, and scored his first goal for the club in a 1–1 away draw.

After two successful individual campaigns with Levski, he left the club at the end of his contract in May 2017.

Maccabi Haifa
On 22 June 2017, Kostadinov signed as a free agent for Israeli Premier League club Maccabi Haifa on a two-year contract. He made his competitive debut for the club on 29 July, playing full 90 minutes of a 2017–18 Toto Cup Al match against Bnei Sakhnin at Acre Municipal Stadium; Maccabi won 4–1. Kostadinov played his first Israeli Premier League match on the opening day of the season during their 2–0 away defeat against Bnei Yehuda on 21 August.

On 16 September 2017, Kostadinov scored his first goals in a 4–2 home win over Hapoel Ra'anana. He scored his second Maccabi goal on 5 May 2018 in a 1–1 draw at Bnei Sakhnin.

Arsenal Tula
On 1 July 2018, Kostadinov joined Russian Premier League club Arsenal Tula on a 2+1-year contract, for an undisclosed fee reported to be €200,000. On 29 July, he made his competitive debut in their season opener against Dynamo Moscow by replacing Kantemir Berkhamov for the final 32 minutes of a 0–0 home draw. On 5 October 2018, he scored his first Russian Premier League goal in a 1–1 home draw against FC Ufa.

APOEL
On 26 July 2022, Kostadinov signed with APOEL in Cyprus. He scored his first goal for the club on 17 September 2022, in a 0–2 win over Olympiakos Nicosia.

International career
He was called up to the senior Bulgaria squad by Ivaylo Petev for a 2018 FIFA World Cup qualifier against Luxembourg in September 2016. Kostadinov earned his first cap on 7 October under new manager Petar Hubchev, playing the full 90 minutes in the 1–4 away loss against France in another qualification match for the 2018 World Cup.

On 31 August 2017, Kostadinov scored his second international goal in a 3–2 home win against Sweden.

International goals
Scores and results list Bulgaria's goal tally first.

Career statistics

Club

International

Honours

Club 
 Ludogorets
 A Group (2): 2011–12, 2012–13
 Bulgarian Cup (1): 2011–12
 Bulgarian Supercup (1): 2012

References

External links
 
 Profile at Sportal.bg
 Profile at Theplayersagent.com
 Profile at LevskiSofia.info

1990 births
Living people
Bulgarian footballers
Bulgaria international footballers
Bulgaria under-21 international footballers
Association football midfielders
Neftochimic Burgas players
FC Pomorie players
PFC Ludogorets Razgrad players
PFC Beroe Stara Zagora players
PFC Levski Sofia players
Maccabi Haifa F.C. players
FC Arsenal Tula players
APOEL FC players
First Professional Football League (Bulgaria) players
Second Professional Football League (Bulgaria) players
Israeli Premier League players
Russian Premier League players
Cypriot First Division players
Bulgarian expatriate footballers
Expatriate footballers in Israel
Bulgarian expatriate sportspeople in Israel
Expatriate footballers in Russia
Expatriate footballers in Cyprus
People from Burgas Province